Etiandro Igualdin Tavares (born July 24, 1993) is a Bissau-Guinean footballer who last played as a forward for FC Tucson in USL League One.

Career

Professional
On March 6, 2015, it was announced that Tavares signed a professional contract with USL club Real Monarchs SLC.  On March 22, he made his professional debut in a 0–0 draw against LA Galaxy II.

References

1993 births
Living people
Bissau-Guinean footballers
Bissau-Guinean expatriate footballers
Arizona Western Matadors men's soccer players
Real Monarchs players
Fresno Fuego players
FC Tulsa players
Association football forwards
Expatriate soccer players in the United States
USL Championship players
USL League Two players
FC Tucson players
USL League One players